Blade Dancer: Lineage of Light, released in Japan as , is a video game made exclusively for the PlayStation Portable. It is a turn-based role-playing video game in which players take on the role of the boy Lance who must save the world with the help of his friends.

Features
 Unique fighting system - rounds do not begin until a monster is struck
 New crafting system lets you combine items together and create new weapons and items
 Develop skills called Lunabilities to use powerful new attacks against stronger monsters

Reception

The game received "mixed" reviews according to the review aggregation website Metacritic.  In Japan, Famitsu gave it a score of two sevens and two sixes for a total of 26 out of 40.

References

External links
 

2006 video games
Nippon Ichi Software games
PlayStation Portable games
Role-playing video games
PlayStation Portable-only games
Multiplayer and single-player video games
Video games developed in Japan
UTV Ignition Games games
Sony Interactive Entertainment games